St Mark's Ecumenical Church and Community Centre is an ecumenical church and community centre on Tollgate Road in the Beckton area of Newham, London. It opened in 1987 and its congregations include a Church of England congregation (which also forms the area's Anglican parish church) and a Baptist one.

References

Christian organizations established in 1987
Mark's
Mark's
Beckton